André Poggenborg (born 17 September 1983) is a German goalkeeping coach and former footballer.

Career

Playing career
The last club he played for was Fortuna Köln.

Coaching career
Since June 2017, Poggenborg was also the goalkeeping coach of Fortuna Köln. However, he remained as a stand-by player for the first team.

References

External links

1983 births
Living people
German footballers
Association football goalkeepers
SC Preußen Münster players
MSV Duisburg II players
BV Cloppenburg players
Sportfreunde Lotte players
SV Eintracht Trier 05 players
SC Fortuna Köln players
Sportspeople from Münster
3. Liga players
Regionalliga players
Footballers from North Rhine-Westphalia